Hoài Ân is a district (huyện) of Bình Định province in the South Central Coast region of Vietnam. The district capital is at Tăng Bạt Hổ.

References

Districts of Bình Định province